Muça is a surname. Notable people with the surname include:

 Gentian Muça (born 1987), Albanian footballer 
 Selim Muça (1936–2016), Albanian Muslim cleric
 Shkëlqim Muça (born 1960), Albanian football coach and player

See also
 Musa (name)

Albanian-language surnames